Buckeye, California may refer to:
 Buckeye, which is the former name of Carbondale, California
 Buckeye, El Dorado County, California
 Buckeye, Plumas County, California
 Buckeye, Shasta County, California
 Buckeye, Yolo County, California
 Buckeye, Yuba County, California